Anomodontaceae is a family of mosses belonging to the order Hypnales.

Genera:
 Curviramea H.A.Crum
 Haplohymenium Dozy & Molk.

References

Hypnales
Moss families